Traditional bone-setting is a type of a folk medicine in which practitioners are engaged in joint manipulation. Before the advent of chiropractors, osteopaths and physical therapists, bone-setters were the main providers of this type of treatment. Traditionally, they practiced without any formal training in accepted modern medical procedures. Bone-setters would also reduce joint dislocations and "re-set" bone fractures.

History
The practice of joint manipulation and treating fractures dates back to ancient times and has roots in most countries. The earliest known medical text, the Edwin Smith papyrus of 1552 BC, describes the Ancient Egyptian treatment of bone-related injuries. These early bone-setters would treat fractures with wooden splints wrapped in bandages or made a cast around the injury out of a plaster-like mixture. It is not known whether they performed amputations as well.

In the 16th century, monks and nuns with some knowledge of medicine went on to become healers and bone-setters after the dissolution of monasteries in the British Isles. However, many bone-setters were non-religious and the majority of them were self-taught. Their skills were then passed on from generation to generation, creating families of bone-setters. Notable families include the Taylor family of Whitworth and the Matthew family of the Midlands.

With the advancement of modern medicine beginning in the 18th century, bone-setters began to be recognised for their efficiency in treatment but did not receive the praise or status that physicians did. Some of these self-taught healers were considered legitimate, while others were perceived as "quacks". In Great Britain, one of the most famous was the bone-setter Sally Mapp (d. 1737). Known as "Crazy Sally", she learned her skill from her father and was known for her arm strength and ability to reset almost any bone. Though she lacked the medical education of physicians, she successfully treated dislocated shoulders and knees, among other treatments, at the Grecian Coffee House in London and in the town of Epsom. In the United States, the "Bone-setter" Sweet family carried the skill for generations, with Charles Sweet being one of the most famous bone-setters in all of New England. In Italy, Regina Dal Cin, a bone-setter who learned the skill from her mother,  is considered to be an expert in the reconstruction of the congenital and antiquated dislocations of the femur.

Bone-setters treated the majority of the population since they were cheaper than licensed physicians. Royal families would employ bone-setters when the court physicians were inadequate or inefficient. 

The Apothecaries Act 1815 in Great Britain called for surgeons to take courses similar to physicians, a move that would raise the status of surgeons to be more in line with that of the elite physician. This allowed for some bone-setters to transition into the medical profession and encouraged interest in bone and joint surgery. As a result, surgical instruments and tools for bone-related injuries were then developed.

21st century
In some developing countries, traditional bone-setters are popular and can be the only address for treatment of bone-related injuries. Most often it will be the case that there is a shortage of orthopedic doctors and surgeons in the country and so the two practitioners coexist in the same setting. In parts of South America, Asia and Africa, traditional bone-setters treat musculoskeletal injuries in general, not just fractures and dislocations. Traditional bone-setters are also known to offer cheaper services and allegedly faster treatment options.

In Japan, bone-setting is known as sekkotsu. In China, it is known as die-da, and is practiced by martial artists. In Portugal it is known as endireita.

Manipulative surgery 
In a 1932 book on the subject, A. S. Blundell Bankart defined manipulative surgery as "the art and practice of moving joints for therapeutic purposes". In an address delivered to the Royal Society of Medicine in 1923, R. C. Elmslie described the "use of manipulative methods in surgery" as having grown in recent years. He said that "formerly such practitioners were called 'bone-setters'". A book review in Nature in 1934 said that manipulative surgery was "almost a monopoly of the bone-setter".

See also 
 Chiropractic
 Osteopathy

References 

Physical therapy
Pseudoscience